Morappur may refer to:
 Morappur block
 Morappur (state assembly constituency)
 Morappur, Tamil Nadu, a town in the Morappur constituency